Quiarol Lenín Arzú Flores (born 3 March 1985) is a Honduran football defender who currently plays for Deportivo Guastatoya in the Liga Nacional de Fútbol de Guatemala.

Club career
Arzú began his professional career with Liga Nacional de Honduras side Platense in 2005. He has established himself as one of the top central defenders in Honduras. In February 2009, he went on trial to the Chinese side Beijing Guoan alongside his compatriot Hendry Córdova, but the club decided not to sign them.

Arzú went on trial with D.C. United in early 2010 in hopes of securing a contract with the Major League Soccer club. He joined Marathón in summer 2011.

Arzú transferred to China League One side Hubei China-Kyle in February 2013. He was released in June 2013.

International career
Arzú was part of the U-23 Honduras national football team which was coached by Colombian trainer Alexis Mendoza and later by Gilberto Yearwood. The U-23 Honduras national football team was CONCACAF champions and qualified for the 2008 Summer Olympics.

Arzú made his senior debut for Honduras in an October 2010 friendly match against Guatemala and has, as of July 2012, earned a total of 3 caps, scoring no goals.

References

External links

1985 births
Living people
People from Atlántida Department
Association football defenders
Honduran footballers
Honduras international footballers
Footballers at the 2008 Summer Olympics
Olympic footballers of Honduras
Platense F.C. players
C.D. Marathón players
Juticalpa F.C. players
Liga Nacional de Fútbol Profesional de Honduras players
China League One players
Expatriate footballers in China